Chen Weihua is a Chinese journalist, currently serving as EU bureau chief of China Daily, an English-language newspaper owned by the Chinese Communist Party. Chen has previously served as a columnist, chief Washington correspondent, and deputy editor of the U.S. edition of China Daily.

Education 
Chen is a graduate of Fudan University, where he studied international journalism and microbiology. After graduating, Chen has held fellowships at the University of Hawai'i and Macalester College, as well as a John S. Knight journalism fellowship at Stanford University from 2004 until 2005.

Career 
Chen began his journalism career at China Daily in 1987. His writing focuses on U.S. politics and U.S.-China relations.

In 2005, while a journalism fellow at Stanford University, Chen served as the deputy editor-in-chief of the Shanghai Star and the deputy Shanghai bureau chief of China Daily. Since then, Chen has served as a columnist and chief Washington correspondent for China Daily and the deputy editor for China Daily USA. He has appeared on China Central Television, ABC News, NPR and KQED. As of 2020, Chen serves as the EU bureau chief of China Daily. According to the editorial board of The Jerusalem Post, he has remained a popular columnist at China Daily.

Chen has used Twitter to criticize politicians and public figures who are critical of the Chinese government. The Globe and Mail reports that Chen's tweets are consistent with the tone of wolf warrior diplomacy. Chen has defended his tweets publicly, writing in China Daily that: "[i]f... despicable words, deeds and conspiracies do not trigger the strongest response from Chinese diplomats, then they are not doing their job." Chen's Twitter account was briefly suspended in 2019 for what Twitter described as "inciting violence" towards protestors in Hong Kong, after writing that the protestors would have been shot by police if they were in the United States.

During the 2022 Russian invasion of Ukraine, Chen repeated Russian claims disputing the veracity of the Bucha massacre.

References 

Chinese journalists
Living people
Fudan University alumni
1963 births
Chinese expatriates in the United States
Chinese expatriates in Belgium